The Women's Windy City Open 2016 is the women's edition of the 2016 Windy City Open, which is a PSA World Series event (prize money: 150 000 $). The event took place at the University Club of Chicago in Chicago in the United States from the 25 February to 2 March 2016. Raneem El Weleily won her second Windy City Open trophy, beating Nour El Sherbini in the final.

Prize money and ranking points
For 2016, the prize purse was $150,000. The prize money and points breakdown is as follows:

Seeds

Draw and results

See also
2015–16 PSA World Series
Men's Windy City Open 2016
Windy City Open

References

External links
PSA Windy City Open 2016 website
Windy City Open 2015 official website

Windy City Open
Windy City Open
Windy City Open
2016 in women's squash